We're on the Jury is a 1937 American comedy film directed by Ben Holmes and starring Victor Moore and Helen Broderick. The screenplay by Franklin Coen was based on the 1929 play, Ladies of the Jury, written by John Frederick Ballard. The film was produced by RKO Radio Pictures, which premiered it in New York City on February 11, 1937, with a national release the following day on February 12. The film received mixed reviews, one reviewer stated Broderick and Moore's performances "redeem an otherwise mediocre picture."

References

External links

Films directed by Ben Holmes
RKO Pictures films
1937 comedy films
1937 films
American comedy films
American black-and-white films
1930s American films